Billy Berntsson (born 6 December 1984, in Hofterup) is a Swedish footballer who plays as a defender and is currently unsigned.

A product of the youth system at Malmö FF, Berntsson has also played for Herfølge BK, Falkenbergs FF and GIF Sundsvall.

After rejecting a new contract with GIF Sundsvall, Berntsson impressed enough whilst on trial at Kilmarnock to be offered a -year deal in January 2011.

In January 2012 Berntsson signed a 2+1 year deal with Swedish Superettan team Hammarby.

References

External links 
 
 
 Ligafodbol.dk profile (as Billy Bengtsson) 
 

1984 births
Living people
Association football defenders
Swedish footballers
Sweden youth international footballers
Swedish expatriate footballers
Swedish expatriate sportspeople in the United Kingdom
Expatriate men's footballers in Denmark
Expatriate footballers in Scotland
Malmö FF players
Herfølge Boldklub players
Falkenbergs FF players
GIF Sundsvall players
Kilmarnock F.C. players
Hammarby Fotboll players
Allsvenskan players
Superettan players
Danish Superliga players
Scottish Premier League players
People from Karlskrona
Sportspeople from Blekinge County